House of Raging Women is the fifth album of the American comics series Love and Rockets by the Hernandez brothers, Gilbert and Jaime, and published in 1988.

The cover of the compilation is by Jaime Hernandez (Xaime), the back cover by Gilbert (Beto).

Contents 
These stories are dated 1984–1988.

Chronology
Previous album: Tears from Heaven <-> Next album: Duck Feet.

Comics publications
1988 graphic novels
Fantagraphics titles